Purgatory is a short film produced by Goma Films and directed by Spanish filmmaker Isma Rubio. It was released in 2007. The film is a ten minutes long short that depicts a pub that is not what it looks like, half way between heaven and hell.

Plot
"Three people, very different to each other, live their last experience."

Awards
 Selected Film in 2007 European Short Film Festival FEC Cambrils-Reus (ESP)
 Selected in 2008 Festival Cinema Villa de la Almunia (USA)

External links
 http://www.gomafilms.com
 

Spanish short films
2007 films
Fiction about purgatory
2000s Spanish films